In Panamanian cuisine, tamal de olla, which is Spanish for "tamale of the pot/pan," is best described as a Panamanian-style tamale that fills the baking pan in which it is cooked, and is not wrapped in a banana or plantain leaf.  The ingredients include pork or chicken cooked with corn-stuffed cornmeal (with "maiz nuevo"), vegetables (onion, tomato, and bell pepper), olives, and raisins.  Some also add chopped prunes.

See also
 List of casserole dishes
 List of stuffed dishes

Panamanian cuisine
Casserole dishes
Stuffed dishes